The Intel 8288 is a bus controller designed for Intel 8086/8087/8088/8089. The chip is supplied in 20-pin DIP package. The 8086 (and 8088) operate in maximum mode, so they are configured primarily for multiprocessor operation or for working with coprocessors. Necessary control signals are generated by the 8288. It was used in the IBM PC, XT and its clones. IBM PC AT used its successor Intel 82288.

Pin assignment and function for the control lines

Variants

Both Intel 8288 and I8288 (industrial grade) version were available for US$14.30 and $33.75 in quantities of 100 respectively.  The available 82C88 CMOS version was outsourced to Oki Electronic Industry Co., Ltd.  The package version of Intel 82C88 branded in 20-pin PLCC of sampling at fourth quarter of 1985.

References

External links 
8288 Bus-Controller data sheet

Intel chipsets
IBM PC compatibles
Input/output integrated circuits